William Henry Holt (November 29, 1842 – March 6, 1919) was the first judge of the United States District Court for the District of Puerto Rico, as established by the Foraker Act of 1900. Holt was appointed to this position by President William McKinley, and served a single four-year term from 1900 to 1904.

Biography

Holt was born on November 29, 1842, in Bath County, Kentucky. He was educated in the common schools of Kentucky and later at the Twinsburg Institute in Ohio and the Fort Edward Institute in New York. He graduated, summa cum laude, in 1862, from Albany Law School. He was admitted to the Kentucky bar in 1863 and began practicing law in Mt. Sterling, Kentucky. During this time period he campaigned against slavery and in favor of the Fourteenth Amendment. In 1884, Holt was elected Associate Justice of the Kentucky Court of Errors and Appeals serving as chief justice from 1890 to 1892.

District Court service

In 1900, President McKinley offered Holt the office of United States district judge for the newly created United States District Court for the District of Puerto Rico, although Holt had not solicited for the job. He accepted the appointment on June 5, 1900, and moved to San Juan, Puerto Rico. Holt oversaw the transition, both from a Spanish Legal System to an American Legal System and from a Military Justice System to a Civilian Justice System.  He established local rules for the court. He served on the court until the expiration of his term in mid 1904.

Later life

After the expiration of his term, Holt returned to Kentucky, living in Pewee Valley. He resumed the practice of law, which he continued until his death on March 6, 1919.

References

Further reading
Guillermo A. Baralt, History of the Federal Court in Puerto Rico: 1899-1999 (2004) (also published in Spanish as Historia del Tribunal Federal de Puerto Rico)

Judges of the United States District Court for the District of Puerto Rico
1842 births
1919 deaths
People from Bath County, Kentucky
People from Mount Sterling, Kentucky
Chief Justices of the Kentucky Supreme Court
Kentucky lawyers
Albany Law School alumni
United States Article I federal judges appointed by William McKinley
People from Pewee Valley, Kentucky